Lincoln Township is the name of some places in the U.S. state of Pennsylvania:

Lincoln Township, Bedford County, Pennsylvania
Lincoln Township, Huntingdon County, Pennsylvania
Lincoln Township, Somerset County, Pennsylvania

See also
 Lincoln, Pennsylvania (disambiguation)
 Lincoln Township (disambiguation)

Pennsylvania township disambiguation pages